Ennis is a city in eastern Ellis County, Texas. The population is 20,159 according to the 2020 census, with an estimated population of 21,210 in 2021. Ennis is home to the annual National Polka Festival.

History

The area that would later become the city of Ennis was first inhabited by the Tonkawa Native Americans. The area was also settled by several Native American tribes including the Waco, Bidai, Anadarko, and Kickapoo until pioneers arrived in the early-to-mid 19th century. When Ellis County was established and organized in 1850, much of the area was sparsely inhabited by isolated farmsteads as the nearby city of Dallas was in its infancy at the time. However, communities such as Ovilla, Waxahachie, and Bristol would have been settled and founded prior to the establishment of the city of Ennis.

In 1871 the Houston and Texas Central Railroad (H&TC) arrived at the spot that would become Ennis as it built north towards Dallas. The city was established that year and surveyed a year later. It is named after Cornelius Ennis, a founder of the H&TC Railroad.

Between 1874 and 1890, the population of Ennis grew tenfold from approximately 300 to 3,000. Many of the new settlers came from the defeated Confederate States of America and others came from the war-torn European nations that later became Czechoslovakia. This early growth was attributed to the success of cotton production in the region, making Ennis a center of trade and commerce for both farmers and the railroad. The influx of Czech migrants would also shape and transform the cultural heritage of the community for years to come.

In 1891, the H&TC chose Ennis to be its northern division headquarters. The machine shops and roundhouse employed several hundred men. One condition of the agreement was that as long as Ennis was able to furnish water the shops could not be moved from the community. The city built the first of three lakes for this purpose: Old City Lake in 1892, followed by New Lake in 1895, and Lake Clark (an extension of New Lake) in 1940. However H&TC would later be acquired by the Texas and New Orleans Railroad (T&NO), a subsidiary of Southern Pacific, in 1934. While it no longer hosted the company headquarters, the shops and yard in Ennis would remain and continue to be used as a hub for other lines and branches serving the city.

On July 14, 1902, the Corsicana Oil Citys of the Texas League moved that day's game against Texarkana to Ennis, due to Sunday blue laws in Coriscana. Future major-leaguer Nig Clarke set an all-time record by hitting eight home runs in ten at bats in a 51–3 victory. (Clarke was helped mightily by the fact that Ennis' tiny ballpark featured a right field fence only about 210 feet from home plate.)

The expansion of the cotton industry supplemented by the railroad provided access to foreign and domestic markets through the port of Houston. By 1920, a total of 152,601 bales of cotton were ginned and shipped from Ellis County, the most of any county in America. In part to the city's significant contribution, the Ennis Chamber of Commerce adopted the slogan 'Where Railroads and Cotton Fields Meet." These two industries - trade and cotton production - produced immense wealth for the community that could be seen in the residential development of the city. Lawyers, doctors, businessmen, and other wealthy residents built churches of many different denominations and numerous fraternal organizations met regularly. Elegant houses along "the Avenue" and north were accompanied by dozens of Folk Victorian houses and Craftsman style bungalows. These Victorian houses and Craftsman bungalows in the northwestern part of the city would eventually become a part of the Templeton-McCanless Residential Historic District.

By the mid-20th century Ennis had become a modern community with schools, three movie theaters, several drugstores, banks and automobile dealerships. Descendants of early settlers had developed new traditions like the National Polka Festival and the Ennis Bluebonnet Trail. Moreover, the city was connected to Dallas to the north and Houston to the South by Interstate Highway 45.

The commercial strip along Ennis Ave. between Downtown and Interstate 45 was hit by a tornado on May 15th, 2013, rendering four homes uninhabitable and damaging as many as 55 businesses. The damage caused by the tornado impacted the National Register Historic District, with some of its historic buildings facing demolition. However, demolition was opposed by local community leaders and activists. As a result, these damaged buildings were sold by the city to developers with the intention of repairing the buildings. Further restoration and revitalization plans were implemented in the Downtown Comprehensive Plan, and the city was admitted to the Texas Main Street Program in January 2015. As a result of these efforts small businesses have been displaced and the downtown is still in shambles.

Railroads in Ennis

Throughout the city's history, railroads have been instrumental in the community's early economic boom and supplemented the city's growth for over a century. Three railroads initially laid tracks and operated to and from Ennis—the Houston and Texas Central (H&TC) running north to south-east, the Texas Midland Railroad spurring to the northeast, and the Waxahachie Tap Railroad—later known as the Central Texas and Northwestern Railroad (CT&N)—coming in from the northwest. The CT&N was merged into the H&TC by the early 1900s and both remaining railroads serving the city would be merged into the Texas and New Orleans Railroad in 1934, eventually merging into its parent company Southern Pacific Railway by 1961. In 1996, Southern Pacific would merge into Union Pacific Railroad which is now serves as the sole rail operator in the city, maintaining a yard and local base of operations for the Ennis Subdivision.

The construction of the Houston and Texas Central Railway would be directly responsible for the early development of the city. Not only was the community strategically located in the middle of the Blackland Prairie, but it was located along the proposed H&TC line from Houston to Dallas—the first rail connection between both cities. However, the railroad's decision to establish Ennis meant that the nearby town of Burnham—located five miles south near the present-day community of Ensign—would be bypassed. The issue of this decision presented itself when many businesses in Burnham were attracted to the railroad and relocated to Ennis. As a result, a mob of angry residents reacted violently to the railroad's bypass and attacked citizens in the city of Ennis, killing one and injuring several others. Burnham, an otherwise well-planned and relatively developed city, would eventually decline and become a ghost town in the coming decades.

In 1870—as the H&TC was laying track in Ellis County—residents of the neighboring city of Waxahachie refused to give bonds to the railroad and resisted the development of a rail link to the system. After the railroad brought significant growth to Ennis and the decline of the bypassed community of Burnham took hold, attitudes changes as opportunistic businessmen and lawmakers chartered the Waxahachie Tap Railroad to link Waxahachie to the H&TC in an effort to reap some of the economic benefits. Construction was completed in 1879, establishing a 13-mile connection across Ellis County between both cities. In 1881, the railroad would be reorganized into the Central Texas and Northwestern Railway and secured state legislation permitting the railroad to build out west into the Panhandle, but no further construction would be made on the railroad. Eventually, the CT&N was merged into the H&TC in 1901.

In 1882, the H&TC began construction on a spur line which would span over 100 miles from Ennis to the city of Paris, Texas, linking a southern terminus of the St. Louis and San Francisco Railroad. This would bypass the city of Dallas and provide a direct link from St. Louis, Missouri to the port cities of Houston and Galveston. However, in 1885—just three years into construction—the H&TC went into receivership after only building half of the line, stopping just south of the city of Quinlan. In 1892, the Texas Midland Railroad was chartered by businesswoman Hetty Green who would purchase the northeastern spur from the H&TC. The link between the cities of Ennis and Paris would finally be made 13 years later.

After a decade of operation, the Texas Midland was bought out by parties interested in a link and partnership between the Frisco Line and Rock Island Line. Plans were announced to build a line 65 miles south from Ennis to Waco to connect with the recently established Burlington-Rock Island Railroad, a joint venture of the Rock Island Line and Burlington Route. There was significant potential of Ennis becoming a major railroad hub and junction, which could have significantly boosted its already booming development. However, this southern extension would never come to fruition and the Texas Midland would eventually be bought out and annexed by Southern Pacific in 1928, which leased the line to its subsidiary Texas and New Orleans Railroad. In 1934, the T&NO would fully acquire both the Texas Midland and the Houston and Texas Central, dissolving both companies in a merger to consolidate the H&TC line into the Southern Pacific system and fully abandon the Texas Midland Route. While Ennis would continue to see T&NO service to Dallas and Houston, the northeastern spur from Ennis to Paris would sit abandoned and go unused for almost a decade. A washout of the bridge spanning the Trinity River would lead to the official abandonment and decommissioning of the line between Ennis and Kaufman in 1942.

The city was also served by the Texas Electric Railway, an extensive interurban railway network in North Texas that stretched over 200 miles in length at its peak. The line historically ran through Ennis at street level along Dallas Street before running parallel to the T&NO tracks outside of the city center. From 1913 to 1941, Ennis was a stop along the Dallas-Corsicana Line, but the rise of the automobile, decline in ridership, and the economic strain of World War II led to the suspension of service and closure of the line. Like the Texas Midland's spur along Breckenridge Street, the interurban line ran along Dallas Street and was likewise paved over after service was suspended. However, these tracks were revealed and partially restored during street renovations in the late-2010s.

By the mid-20th century, the significance of the railroad began to decline in the city, as the postwar boom of the mid-century favored the automobile over the locomotive. Texas and New Orleans' Sunbeam and Hustler services were cut in 1955 and 1957 respectively, after serving the city since the T&NO's takeover of the H&TC. Passenger service would not return to Ennis, as attempts by Amtrak to restore service to the city were largely unsuccessful. Ten years after the T&NO's merger into Southern Pacific in 1961, Southern Pacific would initially resist attempts to route the Lone Star along the line through Ennis in the early 1970s. In 1989, a spur of the Texas Eagle—the successor of the Lone Star service—running from Dallas to Houston would run nonstop through the city during the alternate service's brief three-year stint in the early 1990s. Shortly after in 1996, Southern Pacific would merge into Union Pacific, who has since been the sole railroad operating in the city. Union Pacific would go on to commemorate the city's significant railroad history by honoring the legacy of its local yard workers—some of whom were fourth and fifth-generation railroaders - in awarding the city a membership to the company's Train Town USA registry in 2013.

Templeton-McCanless Historic District

The Templeton-McCanless Residential Historic District is named in honor of two notable figures instrumental in the early development of the city, one of whom—Hix McCanless—was the architect for several early homes built in Ennis from the late 19th century to early 20th century. Because of the city's economic boom and the general prosperity of the Gilded Age during this era, many of these early homes were built indulgently with ornate details and great levels of craftsmanship in adherence to the pre-modern architectural styles of the time—namely in the Neoclassical, American Craftsman, and Folk Victorian styles. However, many of these original homes were lost to neglect, demolition, fire, and careless renovation during the 20th century, precipitating the need to preserve the locally historic significance of those remaining. The historic district was created in 1986 after five years of grassroots efforts from the Ennis Heritage Society (now the Ennis Historical Society) and is now an officially registered district in the National Register of Historic Places dedicated to the protection and preservation of these homes. Today, dozens of homes are historically preserved in their original style. Some of the homes have been named after the architect of the house or the family name of its first residents.

Geography

Ennis is in the northeastern region of Texas, in eastern Ellis County. Interstate 45 passes through the east side of the city, with access from Exits 247 through 255. I-45 leads north  to Dallas and south  to Houston. U.S. Route 287 curves around the south side of Ennis and leads northwest  to Waxahachie, the Ellis County seat. Texas State Highway 34 passes through the center of Ennis, leading northeast  to Kaufman and southwest  to Italy.

Climate
The climate in this area is characterized by hot, humid summers and generally mild to cool winters.  According to the Köppen Climate Classification system, Ennis has a humid subtropical climate, abbreviated "Cfa" on climate maps.

Demographics

As of the 2020 United States census, there were 20,159 people, 6,642 households, and 4,985 families residing in the city.

Arts and culture

Events

The National Polka Festival is a three-day festival that has been hosted annually since 1967 during the Memorial Day weekend to commemorate the city's historic Czech Texan history and heritage. The festival features Czech cuisine, polka music, a Memorial Day parade through downtown, and polka dances hosted at event halls operated by fraternal organizations such as Sokol or the Knights of Columbus. There is a homecoming-like competition among residents and community-based fraternal organizations to crown the annual Duke and Duchess of Ennis. The Ennis Polka Run takes place to help fund the Rotary Club and the Children's Reading Club of Ennis.

The Bluebonnet Trails Festival celebrates the state flower of Texas and the vibrant bloom of wildflowers in the surrounding countryside. The festival includes sightseeing excursions and a street fair in downtown. The festival is held on the third weekend of April, and the Bluebonnet Trails are hosted for the entire month. First hosted in Kachina Prairie Park in 1938, the Bluebonnet Trails have since expanded into a route of several dozen miles along rural farm roads throughout the surrounding countryside east and northeast of the city. The routes for these sightseeing excursions have been officially hosted and mapped out by the Ennis Garden Club since 1951. To commemorate the popularity of the Bluebonnet Trails Festival and the efforts made to celebrate and preserve the state flower of Texas, the Texas Legislature designated Ennis the "Bluebonnet City of Texas" and also declared Ennis the official "Bluebonnet Trail of Texas" in 1997.

The city hosts several other events throughout the year. Unity One Blues on Main Summer Music Festival is a jazz and blues festival hosted in June; Ennis Freedom Fest is a parade and firework show celebrating the 4th of July; the Fall Festival and Monster Mash Dash 5k Marathon are hosted in October; and the Lights of Ennis Festival, the Parade of Lights, and Our Lady of Guadalupe Procession are hosted in December during the Christmas season.

Attractions

Lake Bardwell is a reservoir managed by the U.S. Army Corps of Engineers located southwest of Ennis. It is a flood-control reservoir in the Trinity River Basin and a conservation pool in the Trinity Valley Authority. Surrounding the lake is a park system consisting of Big Mustang Creek Park, Little Mustang Creek Park, High View Park, Love Park, Mott Park, and Highview Marina, all of which offer boat ramps. The lake and parks offer hiking, horseback riding, camping, fishing, and sport boating.

Texas Motorplex in Ennis is a quarter-mile drag racing facility built in 1986 by former funny car driver Billy Meyer. It hosts the annual NHRA O'Reilly Fall Nationals in September, when hundreds of professional and amateur drag racers compete for over $2 million in prize money.

Galaxy Drive-In Theatre Galaxy Drive-In Theatre first opened in 2004, it was with only 3 screens. 16 years later they've expanded to 7 screens, featuring the newest films Hollywood has to offer. All the films shown at the Galaxy Drive-In Theatre are projected digitally and, in certain instances, in 3-D, a rarity in the world of drive-in cinema. Galaxy Drive-In is open SEVEN days a week 365 days a year.

Ennis Railroad and Cultural Heritage Museum is housed in the former Van Noy restaurant building. The museum's collections include: railroad and cultural memorabilia including items related to the Houston and Central Texas Railroad; a large diorama of the old engine roundhouse that once existed just north of the museums location; a large collection of rare china; and a MKT caboose.

Kachina Prairie is a city park preserving one of the last remaining examples of untouched Texas blackland prairie. The first Ennis bluebonnet trail was marked through this area in 1938.

Government
The city of Ennis has a City Commissioner/City Manager government type, with several commissioners representing different wards of the city government in city council. The city is also one of the largest incorporated cities in the United States that continues to elect its City Marshal. 

Below is a list of members of the City Government and their position:

Education
Education is administered by the Ennis Independent School District, which consists of two early childhood centers, four elementary schools, two intermediate schools, one junior high, and Ennis High School. Secondary education offers several extracurricular programs, such as UIL (University Interscholastic League) Academics and Sports, TSA (Technology Student Association), and the National FFA Organization. Junior high and high school sports include baseball, football, basketball, volleyball, tennis, cross country, track, powerlifting, softball, soccer, and golf.

Notable people

In popular culture
Scenes from the following movies were filmed in Ennis: Deadly Blessing (1981) starring Sharon Stone; On Valentine's Day (1986) starring Hallie Foote and Michael Higgins; and Walking Tall: The Payback (2007) with Kevin Sorbo and Haley Ramm.

Scenes from the documentary Flight of the Butterflies (2012) were filmed on Ennis' bluebonnet trails.

On March 21, 2009, the TV show Pinks: All Out hosted a contest at the Texas Motorplex.

The Ennis Railroad and Cultural Museum was featured on the NBC travel show, The Texas Bucket List.

References

External links
 City of Ennis official website
 Ennis Chamber of Commerce

Dallas–Fort Worth metroplex
Cities in Texas
Czech-American culture in Texas
Cities in Ellis County, Texas
Populated places established in 1872
1872 establishments in Texas